Events from the year 1678 in France

Incumbents
 Monarch – Louis XIV

Events

23 July – The Battle of Ortenbach, part of the Franco-Dutch War
14 August – The Battle of Saint-Denis, the last major action of the Franco-Dutch War
August 1678 to December 1679 – The Treaties of Nijmegen, in the aftermath of the Franco-Dutch War of 1672–78

Births

Full date missing

Jacques Caffieri, sculptor (d. 1755)
Augustin Lippi, botanist and physician (d. 1675)
Jacques Talbot, cleric and schoolmaster (d. 1756)

Deaths

16 January Madeleine de Souvré, marquise de Sablé, writer and salonnière (b. 1599)
4 June – Catherine Charlotte de Gramont, noblewoman and Princess of Monaco (b. 1639)

Full date missing
Jacques de Chevanes, polemicist (b. ca. 1608) 
Robert Desgabets, Cartesian philosopher and Benedictine prior (b. 1610)
Gilles Guérin, sculptor (b. 1611)

See also

References

1670s in France